Fabio Francisco Vázquez (born 19 February 1994) is an Argentinian professional football player who currently plays for Patronato as a midfielder.

Career
He joined Argentinos Juniors in July 2011 and made his team debut during the 2011/12 season.

References

External links

1994 births
Living people
Argentine footballers
Argentine expatriate footballers
Comisión de Actividades Infantiles footballers
Argentinos Juniors footballers
Crucero del Norte footballers
Instituto footballers
Club Atlético Brown footballers
Cafetaleros de Chiapas footballers
Club Atlético Sarmiento footballers
Club Atlético Patronato footballers
Argentine Primera División players
Primera Nacional players
Ascenso MX players
Association football midfielders
Argentine expatriate sportspeople in Mexico
Expatriate footballers in Mexico
People from Viedma